Treasure Fingers is a DJ and producer based in Atlanta, Georgia, and is signed to Fool's Gold Records.

Biography
Born in a small town in Oklahoma as Ashley Jones, he started originally in the drum and bass band Evol Intent.

He released the worldwide club smash Cross the Dancefloor which was remixed by of Chromeo, Lifelike and Laidback Luke. He has remixed for Chromeo, Miami Horror, Miike Snow among others. He also contributed production to Young Thug's Slime Season 2 .

Singles

Remixes

References

External links

 Treasure Fingers on Discogs
 Treasure Fingers Interview

American DJs
Living people
Year of birth missing (living people)
Record producers from Oklahoma
Record producers from Georgia (U.S. state)